Aeroflot Flight 03 ( Reys 03 Aeroflota) was a passenger flight from Khabarovsk Airport to Petropavlovsk-Kamchatsky Airport. On 3 September 1962 the Aeroflot Tupolev Tu-104 lost control after the airframe started vibrating, resulting in the plane rolling and yawing several times at an altitude of 4,500 meters before crashing.  The aircraft crashed into a swamp, some 90 kilometers away from Khabarovsk.  At the time, it was the deadliest crash in the history of Soviet aviation.

Aircraft 
The aircraft involved in the accident was a Tupolev Tu-104A with two Mikulin AM-3M engines registered to Aeroflot as СССР-42366. The aircraft was produced by the Omsk factory and was released to the Khabarovsk Far East Civil Aviation Directorate division of Aeroflot on 27 September 1958. The cabin of the aircraft had 70 seats; despite this 79 passengers were allowed on board. At the time of the accident, the aircraft had 4,426 flight hours and sustained 1,760 pressurization cycles.

Passengers and crew 
On board the aircraft were 79 passengers, of which 58 were adults and 21 were children.  Seven crew members were also aboard the flight.  The cockpit crew consisted of the following:
 Captain Petr Vasilievich Marsakov, serving as pilot in command
 Co-Pilot Viktor Mikhailovich Gritsenko
 Navigator Vasily Petrovich Zalavsky
 Flight Engineer Yuri Ivanovich Gusynin
 Radio operator Oleg Stepanovich Morozov

Description of accident 
The air traffic controller instructed to follow the established corridor Troitskoe.   Mild stratocumulus clouds were present along the designated route.  At an altitude of 4,000 meters the aircraft ceased communications with Khabarovsk air traffic control, proceeding along the designated route.  At 21:39 local time the pilot switched air traffic controllers, and after receiving permission started increasing altitude to 8,000 meters.  The aircraft started experiencing control difficulties at 4,500 meters, approximately 1 minute and 37 seconds after the last communications with air traffic control.  The pilots expressed dismay at the sharp roll of the wings; the aircraft disappeared from radar 36 seconds later, crashing into a swamp.  All passengers and crew were killed in the crash.

Cause 
No official cause of the accident was discovered, but it was determined that the autopilot feature could have improved some aspects of control.

The commission responsible for investigating the accident concluded that:It is worth noting that the civil commission was not allowed to review materials falling under the classification "Military Secret".  This has led to some theories that the aircraft could have been accidentally shot down by a surface-to-air missile launched from the Litovko military base.

References

Aviation accidents and incidents in 1962
Aviation accidents and incidents in the Soviet Union
03
1962 in the Soviet Union
Accidents and incidents involving the Tupolev Tu-104
September 1962 events in Europe